James Bertram Collip  (November 20, 1892 – June 19, 1965) was a Canadian biochemist who was part of the Toronto group which isolated insulin. He served as the Chair of the Department of Biochemistry at McGill University from 1928–1941 and Dean of Medicine at the University of Western Ontario from 1947–1961, where he was a charter member of The Kappa Alpha Society.

Education

Born in Belleville, Ontario, he enrolled at Trinity College at the University of Toronto at the age of 15, and studied physiology and biochemistry. He obtained a Ph.D. in Biochemistry from the same university in 1916.

Career
In 1915, at the age of 22, Collip accepted a lecturing position in Edmonton in the Department of Physiology at the University of Alberta Faculty of Medicine, shortly before completing his doctorate. He fulfilled the role for 7 years, eventually rising to the position of Professor and Head of the Department of Biochemistry in 1922. His research at the time was mainly focused on blood chemistry of vertebrates and invertebrates.

He took a sabbatical leave beginning in April 1921, and travelled to Toronto on a Rockefeller Travelling Scholarship for a six-month position with Professor J. J. R. MacLeod of the University of Toronto's Department of Physiology. There his research program (on the effect of pH on the concentration of sugar in the blood) would take him to marine biological stations in Woods Hole, Massachusetts and St. Andrews, New Brunswick before he returned to Toronto late in the year.

MacLeod was overseeing the work of Frederick Banting and Charles Best in their search for a treatment for diabetes which they had begun in May 1921. In December, when Banting and Best were having difficulties in refining the pancreatic extract, MacLeod freed Collip from his other research to enable him to join the research team. Collip's task was to prepare insulin in a more pure, usable form than Banting and Best had been able to achieve to date.

Success of insulin
In January 1922, after 14-year-old Leonard Thompson suffered a severe allergic reaction to an injection of insulin, Collip achieved the goal of preparing a pancreatic extract pure enough for him to recover and to use in clinical trials. Successful trials were soon completed and the future of insulin was assured. Banting, Best and Collip subsequently shared the patent for insulin, which they sold to the University of Toronto for one dollar.

Due to disagreements between Banting and MacLeod, there was ill will generated within the team. The Nobel Prize for Medicine was awarded to Banting and MacLeod in 1923. Feeling that Best had been overlooked in the award, Banting shared his portion with Best. In response, MacLeod shared his portion with Collip. Nonetheless, Collip is often overlooked as a co-discoverer of insulin.

Following this early success,  Collip returned to Edmonton to take up a position as Head of the new Department of Biochemistry, and to pursue his own studies on hormone research. In 1928 he was recruited to McGill University in Montreal by his former graduate advisor, Archibald Macallum. Collip served as Chair of McGill's Department of Biochemistry from 1928 to 1941. From 1947-1961, Collip was appointed Dean of Medicine at the University of Western Ontario. He is regarded as a pioneer of endocrine research. He did pioneering work with the parathyroid hormone (PTH).

He died on June 19, 1965 at the age of 72.

Honours and awards
 Fellow of the Royal Society of Canada, 1925
 Fellow of the Royal Society, 1933
 Honorary Doctorate D.Sc, Harvard University, 1936
Cameron Prize for Therapeutics of the University of Edinburgh, 1937
 Commander of the Order of the British Empire, 1943
 Honorary Doctorate D.Sc, University of Oxford, 1946
Honorary Doctorate, University of Alberta, 1946
 Medal of Freedom with Silver Palm (US), 1947
 Banting Medal of the American Diabetes Association, 1960
 Honorary Doctorate D.Sc  from the University of Western Ontario, 30 May 1964

References

External links
 
 The Discovery and Early Development of Insulin digital collection, University of Toronto
 Biography of James Bertram Collip

1892 births
1965 deaths
Canadian medical researchers
Trinity College (Canada) alumni
University of Toronto alumni
Academic staff of the University of Toronto
Academic staff of the University of Alberta
Academic staff of the University of Western Ontario
Canadian university and college faculty deans
Canadian Commanders of the Order of the British Empire
Fellows of the Royal Society of Canada
People from Belleville, Ontario
Canadian Fellows of the Royal Society
Academic staff of McGill University
Fellows of the Royal College of Physicians
20th-century Canadian inventors